Eugenia Volodymyrivna Chuprina (Ukrainian: Євгенія Володимирівна Чуприна; pen name, Пані Друїдеса (Mrs. Druids); born July 24, 1971) is a contemporary Ukrainian poet, writer, and playwright. She is the Chair of the Organizing Committee of the International Prize, Olesya Ulyanenko; member of the Ukrainian PEN; member of the National Union of Writers of Ukraine; and the National Union of Journalists She is the winner of the Vladimir Korolenko Prize. Chuprina is the author of poem collections, Твори (Works) (1997, 2000) and Вид знизу (Bottom view) (2002); prose Роман з Пельменем (Romance with Pelmen) (2000, 2002) and mashup novel, Орхидеи ещё не зацвели (Orchids have not yet bloomed) (2010).

Biography

Eugenia Volodymyrivna Chuprina was born July 24, 1971, in Kyiv.
Chuprina studied at the Faculty of Philology of Kyiv State University.

She is the author of collections of poems Твори (Works) (1997, 2000) and Вид знизу (Bottom view) (2002), У хаті, де не працює санвузол (In the house where the bathroom does not work) (2016), У шубі на стиглому тілі (In a fur coat on a ripe body) (2017), and Великі форми (Large forms) (2019). Her prose work, Роман з Пельменем (Romance with Pelmen) (2000, 2002), became the first Russian-language internet bestseller.

Her works have been published in Coast, Philadelphia; Stalker, Los Angeles; magazines Нева, Saint Petersburg; Веселка, Kyiv; СТЫХ, Dnepropetrovsk; Радуга, Kyiv; Отражение, Donetsk; Фабула; Лава, Kharkiv; and elsewhere.

The play Цвєтаєва + Пастернак (Tsvetaeva + Pasternak) was staged at the modern theater Сузір'я, Kyiv. Opposing copyright, she refused to include copyright for her novel, Орхидеи еще не зацвели (Orchids have not yet bloomed), which she posted for free on the website "Сетевая словесность" (Network Literature), but a fuller version of this novel, which the author calls "adult", is available. Chuprina has written columns in EGO, XXL, Жіночому журналі (Women's magazine), and the newspaper 24. She worked as Deputy Editor-in-Chief of the men's magazine, XXL. She was a literary agent of the writer Oles Ulianenko until his death. She compiled the anthology, Мистецький Барбакан. Трикутник 92 (Artistic Barbican. Triangle 92).

Awards
 Vladimir Korolenko Prize

Selected works

Collections of poems
 Твори (1997, 2000)
 Вид знизу (2002)
 У шубі на стиглому тілі (2017)[7]

Collections of verlibriums
 У хаті, де не працює санвузол (2016)

Novels
 Роман з Пельменем(2000, 2002)
 Орхидеи ещё не зацвели (2010)

References

Sources
 Поема «Бджола» на сайті «Дотик Словом» (in Ukrainian)
 Книги, бібліографія: проза, поезія (in Ukrainian)
 ОРХИДЕИ ЕЩЕ НЕ ЗАЦВЕЛИ. Мешап-роман (in Ukrainian)
 Арт-вертеп. Євгенія Чуприна — Автори (in Ukrainian)
 Буквоїд. Євгенія Чуприна — Автори (in Ukrainian)
 Євгенія Чуприна. Куртуазне: Укр. Літ, засновник — НСПУ (in Ukrainian)
 «За філіжанкою кави»: Євгенія Чуприна та Дмитро Лазуткін (in Ukrainian)
 Блог на кореспонденті (in Ukrainian)

External links
 Куртуазний матріархат у Львові via YouTube (in Ukrainian)
 Поезія про поезію. Всесвітній день поезії у Львові. Виступ Євгенії Чуприної via YouTube (in Ukrainian)
 Євгенія Чуприна. Шляхами Сапфо via YouTube (in Ukrainian)
 Shopping Hour feat Евгения Чуприна — Ревность Философа via YouTube (in Ukrainian)

1971 births
Writers from Kyiv
21st-century Ukrainian poets
Ukrainian novelists
21st-century Ukrainian women writers
Ukrainian women poets
Ukrainian women novelists
Ukrainian writers in Russian
Living people
Ukrainian dramatists and playwrights
Women dramatists and playwrights